Dos Ekis is a 2001 Philippine crime drama film co-written, co-produced and directed by Erik Matti. The film stars Rica Peralejo and Mark Anthony Fernandez. It is the second and final installment of the Ekis film series.

Cast
 Rica Peralejo as Charisse Cubarubias
 Mark Anthony Fernandez as Benito Quebrar
 Celso Ad. Castillo as Dodi Zarcon
 John Arcilla as Bunny
 Ricardo Cepeda as Insp. Dax Porras
 Raven Villanueva as Libay Sta. Maria
 Rina Reyes as Vivian Sales
 Kokoy Jimenez as Tansyong Jimenez
 Madeleine Nicolas as Old Chinese Hardware Owner
 Eddie Arenas as Charisse's Grandfather
 Alvin Bernales as Baldo Sta. Maria
 Army Arnaldo as Jovy
 Rose Gavela as Ate Lita
 Gigie Perato as Ayda
 Mely Soriano as Tansyon's Relative
 Erik Matti as Bar DJ
 Richard Somes as Bar Waiter
 A.J. Dela Cruz as Flower Girl
 Abby Francisco as Bar Girl
 Mike Sarrosa as Benito's Neighbor
 Charry Castinlag as Flower Shopkeeper

References

External links

2001 films
Filipino-language films
Philippine drama films
Viva Films films
Films directed by Erik Matti